Oeum Cerameicum or Oion Kerameikon was a deme of ancient Attica. It was surnamed to distinguish it from Oeum Deceleicum near Deceleia. Its name shows that it was near the outer Kerameikos.

Its site is unlocated.

References

Populated places in ancient Attica
Former populated places in Greece
Demoi
Lost ancient cities and towns